Tell It the Way It Is! is an album recorded in 1963 by saxophonist Paul Gonsalves. He is joined by Johnny Hodges and Ray Nance, both members of the Duke Ellington Orchestra, pianist Walter Bishop Jr., and trumpeter Rolf Ericson.

Track listing 
 "Tell It the Way It Is!" (Addison Amor/Walter Bishop Jr.) – 11:37
 "Things Ain't What They Used to Be" (Mercer Ellington/Ted Persons) – 4:43
 "Duke's Place" (Duke Ellington/Bob Katz/Bob Thiele) – 5:28
 "Impulsive" (Johnny Hodges) – 5:01
 "Rapscallion in Rab's Canyon" (Johnny Hodges) – 3:46
 "Body and Soul" (Frank Eyton/Johnny Green/Edward Heyman/Robert Sour) – 5:35

Personnel
 Paul Gonsalves – tenor saxophone
 Johnny Hodges – alto saxophone
 Ray Nance – trumpet, violin
 Rolf Ericson – trumpet
 Walter Bishop Jr. – piano
 Ernie Shepard – bass, vocals
 Osie Johnson – drums

References 

1963 albums
Paul Gonsalves albums
Impulse! Records albums